Dream World is an amusement park in Thanyaburi district, Pathum Thani province, Thailand. The park includes three roller coasters and various other attractions.

History 
Dream World was established by the Kitiparaphon family who operated an amusement park business. Dream World opened on November 12th, 1993 and occupies an area of approximately 25 hectares.

Attractions

The park is divided into several zones such as: Dream World Plaza, Dream Gardens, Fantasy Land, and Adventure Land. The interior of the park is filled with over 40 imported thrill rides and family attractions. The park's main attraction is the park's hanging roller coaster, which is in the middle of Adventure Land, and a model of the Grand Canyon as part of a river rafting attraction.

Dream World Plaza
This includes the main entrance to the park and an area modeled after Disneyland's Main Street USA. It is filled with shops and buildings that are fantasy-themed.

Dream Garden

Dream Garden has a nature theme. This area surrounds a lake near Dream World Plaza. 

List of attractions:
Cable car
Seven Wonders of the World
Speedy Mouse
Bicycle Boat

Fantasy Land

This area is the park's "Fairy World" themd section. It is in the middle of the park.

List of attractions:
Fantasy Garden
The Giant House
Sightseeing Train
Sleeping Beauty's Castle
Hurricane the ride
The Spider
Uncle Tom's farm
4D Adventure

Adventure Land

Adventure Land is the largest zone of the theme park. This area is filled with thrill rides and attractions, and it is themed to space exploration and the future. 

List of attractions: 
Grand Canyon
Super Plash 
The Thunderbirds
Haunted Mansion
Crazy Bus
Monorail Tour
Bumper Boats
Antique Cars
Go Karts Track
Flying Carpets
Black Hole Coaster
Sky Coaster (Former: Hanging Coaster)
Vikings
Bumper Cars
Flying Fishes
Hollywood's Action Show
Red Indian's Boat
Raptor
Tornado

Development
 1995: Installed "Super Splash" from the United States.
 1996: Installed "Magic Carpet" from Italy. Installed "Raptor" from Germany. Installed "Kart" from the United States.
 1997: "Snow town", the first of its kind in Thailand. Installed "Snow Ski Flying" from the United States.
 2000: installed "Hurricane" from Germany. Installed the "Octopus" from Germany.
 2001: Installed the "Grand Canyon" from the United States.
 2002: Celebrated 10 years of Dreamworld.
 2007: Switched the original Hanging coaster train to the Vekoma Floorless style train and renamed to "Sky Coaster".
 2009: Celebrated 15 years of Dreamworld. Installed "4D Adventure” Theater.
 2010: Equipped with "Aliens".
 2011: Park closed on 21 October 2011 due to flooding
 2012: Park reopens 10 January 2012. Installed "Tornado" from Italy.
 2013: Installed "Water Fun" which is a water park with the large Aquatic Play Structure.
 2014: Installed Mini Zoo, An "Animal Farm"

See also
 Safari World
 Siam Park City

References

External links
 

1993 establishments in Thailand
Amusement parks in Thailand
Buildings and structures in Pathum Thani province
Tourist attractions in Pathum Thani province